The Crucible is a 1953 play by American playwright Arthur Miller. It is a dramatized and partially fictionalized story of the Salem witch trials that took place in the Massachusetts Bay Colony during 1692–93. Miller wrote the play as an allegory for McCarthyism, when the United States government persecuted people accused of being communists. Miller was questioned by the House of Representatives' Committee on Un-American Activities in 1956 and convicted of contempt of Congress for refusing to identify others present at meetings he had attended.

The play was first performed at the Martin Beck Theatre on Broadway on January 22, 1953, starring E. G. Marshall, Beatrice Straight and Madeleine Sherwood. Miller felt that this production was too stylized and cold, and the reviews for it were largely hostile (although The New York Times noted "a powerful play [in a] driving performance"). The production won the 1953 Tony Award for Best Play. A year later a new production succeeded and the play became a classic. It is regarded as a central work in the canon of American drama.

Synopsis

Act One
The opening narration explains the context of Salem and the Puritan colonists of Massachusetts, which the narrator depicts as an isolated theocratic society in constant conflict with Native Americans. The narrator speculates that the lack of civil liberties, isolation from civilization, and lack of stability in the colony caused latent internal tensions which would contribute to the events depicted in the play.

The remainder of Act One is set in the attic of local preacher Reverend Samuel Parris. His ten-year-old daughter, Betty Parris, lies motionless. The previous evening, Reverend Parris discovered Betty, some other girls, and his Barbadian slave, Tituba, dancing naked in the forest and engaged in some sort of pagan ritual. The village is rife with rumors of witchcraft and a crowd gathers outside Rev. Parris' house. Parris becomes concerned that the event will cause him to be removed from his position as the town's preacher. He questions the girls' apparent ringleader, his niece Abigail Williams, whom Parris has been forced to adopt after her parents were brutally killed in King Philip's War. Abigail denies they were engaged in witchcraft, claiming that they had been dancing. Afterwards, the wealthy and influential Thomas Putnam and his wife, Ann arrive. At the Putnams' urging, Parris reluctantly reveals that he has invited Reverend John Hale, an expert in witchcraft and demonology, to investigate and leaves to address the crowd.

The other girls involved in the incident join Abigail and a briefly roused Betty, who attempts to jump out of the window. Abigail coerces and threatens the others to "stick to their story" of merely dancing in the woods. The other girls are frightened of the truth being revealed (in actuality, they tried to conjure a curse against Elizabeth Proctor) and being labelled witches, so they go along with Abigail. Betty then faints back into unconsciousness.

John Proctor, a local farmer and husband of Elizabeth, enters. He sends the other girls out (including Mary Warren, his family's maid) and confronts Abigail, who tells him that she and the girls were not performing witchcraft. It is revealed that Abigail once worked as a servant for the Proctors, and that she and John had an affair, for which she was fired. Abigail still harbors feelings for John and believes they are reciprocated, but John denies this. Abigail angrily mocks John for denying his true feelings for her. As they argue, a psalm is sung in the room downstairs. Betty bolts upright and begins screaming.

Rev. Parris runs back into the bedroom and various villagers arrive: Thomas and his wife, Ann, respected local woman Rebecca Nurse, and the Putnam's neighbor, farmer Giles Corey. The villagers, who had not heard the argument, assume that the singing of the psalm by the villagers in a room below had caused Betty's screaming. Tensions between them soon emerge. Mrs. Putnam is a bereaved parent seven times over; she blames witchcraft for her losses and Betty's ailment. The much more reasonable Rebecca suggests a doctor be called instead. Mr. Putnam and Corey have been feuding over land ownership. Parris is unhappy with his salary and living conditions as minister, and accuses Proctor of heading a conspiracy to oust him from the church. Abigail, standing quietly in a corner, witnesses all of this.

Reverend Hale arrives and begins his investigation. Before leaving, Giles fatefully remarks that he has noticed his wife reading unknown books and asks Hale to look into it. Hale questions Rev. Parris, Abigail and Tituba closely over the girls' activities in the woods. As the facts emerge, Abigail claims Tituba forced her to drink blood. Tituba counters that Abigail begged her to conjure a deadly curse. Parris threatens to whip Tituba to death if she does not confess to witchcraft. Tituba breaks down and falsely claims that the Devil is bewitching her and others in town. With prompting from Hale and Putnam, Tituba accuses Sarah Osborne and Sarah Good of witchcraft. Mrs. Putnam identifies Osborne as her former midwife and asserts that she must have killed her children. Abigail decides to play along with Tituba in order to prevent others from discovering her affair with Proctor, whose wife she had tried to curse out of jealousy. She leaps up, begins contorting wildly, and names Osborne and Good, as well as Bridget Bishop as having been "dancing with the devil". Betty suddenly rises and begins mimicking Abigail's movements and words, and accuses George Jacobs. As the curtain closes, the three continue with their accusations as Hale orders the arrest of the named people and sends for judges to try them.

Act Two
In a second narration, the narrator compares the Colony to post-World War II society, presenting Puritan fundamentalism as being similar to cultural norms in both the United States and the Soviet Union. Additionally, fears of Satanism taking place after incidents in Europe and the colonies are compared to fears of Communism following its implementation in Eastern Europe and China during the Cold War. (Again, narration not present in all versions).

The remainder of Act Two is set in the Proctors‘ home. John and Elizabeth are incredulous that nearly forty people have been arrested for witchcraft based on the pronouncements of Abigail and the other girls. John knows their apparent possession and accusations of witchcraft are untrue, as Abigail told him as much when they were alone together in the first act, but is unsure of how to confess without revealing the affair. Elizabeth is disconcerted to learn her husband was alone with Abigail. She believes John still lusts after Abigail and tells him that as long as he does, he will never redeem himself.

Mary Warren enters and gives Elizabeth a 'poppet' (doll-like puppet) that she made in court that day while sitting as a witness. Mary tells that thirty-nine have been arrested so far accused as witches, and they might be hanged. Mary also tells that Goody Osburn will be hanged, but Sarah Good's life is safe because she confessed she made a compact with Lucifer (Satan) to torment Christians. Angered that Mary is neglecting her duties, John threatens to beat her. Mary retorts that she is now an official in the court, she must have to go there on daily basis and she saved Elizabeth's life that day, as Elizabeth was accused of witchcraft and was to be arrested until Mary spoke in her defense. Mary refuses to identify Elizabeth's accuser, but Elizabeth surmises accurately that it must have been Abigail. She implores John to go to court and tell the judges that Abigail and the rest of the girls are pretending. John is reluctant, fearing that doing so will require him to publicly reveal his past adultery.

Reverend Hale arrives, stating that he is interviewing all the people named in the proceedings, including Elizabeth. He mentions that Rebecca Nurse was also named, but admits that he doubts her a witch due to her extreme piousness, though he emphasizes that anything is possible. Hale is sceptical about the Proctors' devotion to Christianity, noting that they do not attend church regularly and that one of their three sons has not yet been baptized; John replies that this is because he has no respect for Parris. Challenged to recite the Ten Commandments, John fatefully forgets "thou shalt not commit adultery". When Hale questions her, Elizabeth is angered that he does not question Abigail first. Unsure of how to proceed, Hale prepares to take his leave. At Elizabeth's urging, John tells Hale he knows that the girl's afflictions are fake. When Hale responds that many of the accused have confessed, John points out that they were bound to be hanged if they did not; Hale reluctantly acknowledges this point.

Suddenly, Giles Corey and Francis Nurse enter the house and inform John and Hale that both of their wives have been arrested on charges of witchcraft; respectively, Martha Corey for reading suspicious books and Rebecca Nurse has been suspected of sacrificing children. A posse led by clerk Ezekiel Cheever and town marshal George Herrick arrive soon afterwards and present a warrant for Elizabeth's arrest, much to Hale's surprise. Cheever picks up the poppet on Elizabeth's table and finds a needle inside. He informs John that Abigail had a pain-induced fit earlier that evening and a needle was found stuck into her stomach; Abigail claimed that Elizabeth stabbed her with the needle through witchcraft, using a poppet as a conduit. John brings Mary into the room to tell the truth; Mary asserts that she made the doll and stuck the needle into it, and that Abigail saw her do so. Cheever is unconvinced and prepares to arrest Elizabeth.

John becomes greatly angered, tearing the arrest warrant to shreds and threatening Herrick and Cheever with a musket until Elizabeth calms him down and surrenders herself. He calls Hale a coward and asks him why the accusers' every utterance goes unchallenged. Hale is conflicted, but suggests that perhaps this misfortune has befallen Salem because of a great, secret crime that must be brought to light. Taking this to heart, John orders Mary to go to court with him and expose the other girls' lies, and she protests vehemently. Aware of John's affair, she warns him that Abigail is willing to expose it if necessary. John is shocked but determines the truth must prevail, whatever the personal cost.

Act Three
The third act takes place thirty-seven days later in the General Court of Salem, during the trial of Martha Corey. Francis and Giles desperately interrupt the proceedings, demanding to be heard. The court is recessed and the men thrown out of the main room, reconvening in an adjacent room. John Proctor arrives with Mary Warren and they inform Deputy Governor Danforth and Judge Hathorne about the girls' lies. Danforth then informs an unaware John that Elizabeth is pregnant, and promises to spare her from execution until the child is born, hoping to persuade John to withdraw his case. John refuses to back down and submits a deposition signed by ninety-one locals attesting to the good character of Elizabeth, Rebecca Nurse and Martha Corey. Herrick also attests to John's truthfulness as well.

The deposition is dismissed by Parris and Hathorne as illegal. Rev. Hale criticizes the decision and demands to know why the accused are forbidden to defend themselves. Danforth replies that given the "invisible nature" of witchcraft, the word of the accused and their advocates cannot be trusted. He then orders that all ninety-one persons named in the deposition be arrested for questioning. Giles Corey submits his own deposition, accusing Thomas Putnam of forcing his daughter to accuse George Jacobs in order to buy up his land (as convicted witches have to forfeit all of their property). When asked by Hathorne to reveal the source of his information, Giles refuses, fearing that he or she will also be arrested. When Danforth threatens him with arrest for contempt, Giles argues that he cannot be arrested for "contempt of a hearing." Danforth then declares the court in session and Giles is arrested.

John submits Mary's deposition, which declares that she was coerced to accuse people by Abigail. Abigail denies Mary's assertions that they are pretending, and stands by her story about the poppet. When challenged by Parris and Hathorne to 'pretend to be possessed', Mary is too afraid to comply. John attacks Abigail's character, revealing that she and the other girls were caught dancing naked in the woods by Rev. Parris on the night of Betty Parris' alleged 'bewitchment'. When Danforth begins to question Abigail, she claims that Mary has begun to bewitch her with a cold wind and John loses his temper, calling Abigail a whore. He confesses their affair, says Abigail was fired from his household over it and that Abigail is trying to murder Elizabeth so that she may "dance with me on my wife's grave."

Danforth brings Elizabeth in to confirm this story, beforehand forbidding anyone to tell her about John's testimony. Unaware of John's public confession, Elizabeth fears that Abigail has revealed the affair in order to discredit John and lies, saying that there was no affair, and that she fired Abigail out of wild suspicion. Hale begs Danforth to reconsider his judgement, now agreeing Abigail is "false", but to no avail; Danforth throws out this testimony based solely upon John's earlier assertion that Elizabeth would never tell a lie.

Confusion and hysteria begin to overtake the room. Abigail and the girls run about screaming, claiming Mary's spirit is attacking them in the form of a yellow bird, which nobody else is able to see. When Danforth tells the increasingly distraught Mary that he will sentence her to hang, she joins with the other girls and recants all her allegations against them, claiming John Proctor forced her to turn her against the others and that he harbors the devil. John, in despair and having given up all hope, declares that "God is dead", and is arrested. Furious, Reverend Hale denounces the proceedings and quits the court.

Act Four
Act Four takes place three months later in the town jail, early in the morning. Tituba, sharing a cell with Sarah Good, appears to have gone insane from all of the hysteria, hearing voices and now actually claiming to talk to Satan. Marshal Herrick, depressed at having arrested so many of his neighbors, has turned to alcoholism. Many villagers have been charged with witchcraft; most have confessed and been given lengthy prison terms and their property seized by the government; twelve have been executed; seven more are to be hanged at sunrise for refusing to confess, including John Proctor, Rebecca Nurse and Martha Corey. Giles Corey was tortured to death by pressing as the court tried in vain to extract a plea; though by holding out, Giles ensured that his sons would receive his land and possessions. The village has become dysfunctional with so many people in prison or dead, and with the arrival of news of rebellion against the courts in nearby Andover, whispers abound of an uprising in Salem. Abigail, fearful of the consequences, steals Parris's life savings and disappears on a ship to England with Mercy Lewis.

Danforth and Hathorne have returned to Salem to meet with Parris, and are surprised to learn that Hale has returned and is meeting with the condemned. Parris, who has lost everything to Abigail, reports that he has received death threats. He begs Danforth to postpone the executions in order to secure confessions, hoping to avoid executing some of Salem's most highly regarded citizens. Hale, deeply remorseful and blaming himself for the hysteria, has returned to counsel the condemned to falsely confess and avoid execution. He presses Danforth to pardon the remaining seven and put the entire affair behind them. Danforth refuses, stating that pardons or postponement would cast doubt on the veracity of previous confessions and hangings.

Danforth and Hale summon Elizabeth and ask her to persuade John to confess. She is bitter towards Hale, both for doubting her earlier and for wanting John to give in and ruin his good name, but agrees to speak with her husband, if only to say goodbye. She and John have a lengthy discussion, during which she commends him for holding out and not confessing. John says he is refusing to confess not out of religious conviction but through contempt for his accusers and the court. The two finally reconcile, with Elizabeth forgiving John and saddened by the thought that he cannot forgive himself and see his own goodness. Knowing in his heart that it is the wrong thing for him to do, John agrees to falsely confess to engaging in witchcraft, deciding that he has no desire or right to be a martyr.

Danforth, Hathorne, and a relieved Parris ask John to testify to the guilt of the other hold-outs and the executed. John refuses, saying he can only report on his own sins. Danforth is disappointed by this reluctance, but at the urging of Hale and Parris, allows John to sign a written confession, to be displayed on the church door as an example. John is wary, thinking his verbal confession is sufficient. As they press him further John eventually signs, but refuses to hand the paper over, stating he does not want his family and especially his three sons to be stigmatized by the public confession. The men argue until Proctor renounces his confession entirely, ripping up the signed document. Danforth calls for the sheriff and John is led away, to be hanged. Facing an imminent rebellion, Putnam and Parris frantically run out to beg Proctor to confess. Hale, guilty over John's death, pleads with Elizabeth to talk John around but she refuses, stating John has "found his goodness".

Characters (in order of appearance)
 Reverend Samuel Parris The minister of Salem. A former merchant, Parris is obsessed with his reputation and frequently complains that the village does not pay him enough, earning him a great deal of scorn. When the trials begin, he is appointed as a prosecutor and helps convict the majority of those accused of witchcraft. Towards the end of the play, he is betrayed by his niece Abigail and begins receiving death threats from angry relatives of the condemned. (In real life, Parris left Salem in 1696, the year his wife, Elizabeth, died. He found his situation untenable. Records in the Suffolk Deeds indicate it likely he returned to business in Boston in 1697. He preached two or three years at Stow. He moved to Concord in 1704 or 1705. He also preached six months in Dunstable in 1711. He died on February 27, 1720, in Sudbury, where he had spent his last years. In 1699 he had remarried, to Dorothy Noyes, in Sudbury.)
 Tituba The Parris family slave, Tituba was brought by Parris from Barbados when he moved to Salem and has served him since. Using her knowledge of herbs and magic, she has been secretly helping Abigail and her friends make love potions, and even conducts a seance on behalf of Ann Putnam. After being framed for witchcraft, she confesses and is subsequently imprisoned with Sarah Good. By the fourth act, she has been driven mad by the harsh conditions and her ending is unknown.
 Abigail Williams The main antagonist of the play. Abigail previously worked as a maid for Elizabeth Proctor. After Elizabeth suspected Abigail of having an illicit relationship with John Proctor, Williams was fired and disgraced. Using her status as Parris's niece to her advantage, she accuses countless citizens of witchcraft, becoming one of the most powerful people in Salem. Eventually, she flees Salem with her uncle's fortune rather than face the consequences of her actions.
 Susanna Walcott A servant girl and part of Abigail's inner circle.
 Ann Putnam A rich and well-connected member of Salem's elite. She has one daughter, Ruth (in real life, Ann Putnam Jr.), but has lost seven other children to illness. Believing witches to be responsible, she eagerly sides with Abigail. (In real life, Ann Putnam (née Carr) had twelve children, ten of whom survived their parents, who both died in 1699).
 Thomas Putnam One of the richest men in Salem. He is greedy and conniving, using the accusations as cover to purchase land seized from convicted witches.
 Betty Parris The ten-year-old daughter of Samuel Parris and one of the primary accusers.
 Mercy Lewis Another primary accuser. In the fourth act, she flees with Abigail to avoid arrest for deceiving the court.
 Mary Warren The Proctor family's servant. She initially helps John, but later turns on him to save herself.
 John Proctor The play's protagonist and husband of Elizabeth Proctor. A local farmer, John is known for his independence and temper, which often gets him into trouble with the authorities. Contemporary notes describe him as a "strong-willed beast of a man". Shamed by an affair with Abigail, John tries to stay out of the trials, but when Elizabeth is charged, he tries to reveal Abigail's deception in court. Betrayed by his maid Mary Warren, John is accused of witchcraft and sentenced to hang. He refuses to confess out of anger towards the court, but ultimately relents. After learning that his confession will likely drive his wife and children into disrepute, he decides to instead admit guilt. He is finally hanged along with several other convicted witches.
 (The real John Proctor was also an innkeeper as well as a farmer, and was aged 60 when executed; Elizabeth was his third wife. He was strongly and vocally opposed to the witch trials from their beginning, being particularly scornful of spectral evidence used in the trials. As in the play, Elizabeth was accused of practicing witchcraft and arrested before John. Unlike the play, John maintained his innocence throughout the ordeal. He was hanged in August, 1692.)
 Giles Corey A close friend of Proctor's. He becomes convinced that the trials are being used to steal land from the guilty and presents evidence to prove his claim. When the court demands to know where he obtained it, he refuses to cooperate and is sentenced to be pressed to death. (The character is based on a real person of the same name, who was also pressed when he would not plead guilty to charges of witchcraft.)
 Rebecca Nurse Although an elderly, respected member of the community, she is sentenced to death on charges of witchcraft (and, in the play, infanticide). (In real life, the jury initially acquitted Nurse but were ordered by William Stoughton to deliberate further. One of her two sisters, Mary Easty (or Eastey), was also hanged for witchcraft in real life, and the other, Sarah Cloyce, narrowly escaped.)
 Reverend John Hale A young minister from Beverly, Massachusetts, known for his knowledge of witchcraft. He starts out as a fervent and devoted servant of the court, using his position to investigate and charge suspected witches. Disillusioned with the corruption and abuses of the trials, he later tries to save as many suspects as possible by getting them to confess. (In reality, Hale was in his mid-fifties when the witch trials commenced.)
 Elizabeth Proctor John's wife. She is also accused of witchcraft, but is spared the death penalty due to being pregnant. She distrusts her husband for his adultery, but eventually chooses to forgive him when he refuses to confess to false charges.
 Ezekiel Cheever The clerk of Salem's General Court. He is responsible for crafting the warrants used to arrest suspected witches.
 George Herrick/John Willard Herrick is the town marshal of Salem, and leads the effort to find and arrest those accused of witchcraft until he falls into despair and turns to alcoholism. Willard is one of his deputies until he refuses to carry out any more arrests, at which point he is charged with witchcraft and hanged.
 Judge John Hathorne One of the two judges presiding over the court. Hathorne is a deeply pious man whose blind faith in Abigail's trustworthiness is largely responsible for the destruction wrought by the trials.
 Deputy Governor Thomas Danforth The chief judge of the court. He views the proceedings as an opportunity to cement his power and influence, eagerly convicting anyone brought before him. His refusal to suspend the trials even as they tear Salem apart makes him, according to Miller, the true villain of the play. (Most of the characterization of Danforth actually comes from the real life Magistrate William Stoughton, who accepted spectral evidence, and as chief judge inclined to believe that all the accused were guilty. In fact, the real Danforth opposed the use of "spectral evidence" and was much more inclined to believe the accused.)

Originality 
During the McCarthy era, German-Jewish novelist and playwright Lion Feuchtwanger became the target of suspicion as a left-wing intellectual during his exile in the US. In 1947, Feuchtwanger wrote a play about the Salem witch trials,  (Delusion, or The Devil in Boston), as an allegory for the persecution of communists, thus anticipating the theme of The Crucible by Arthur Miller;  premiered in Germany in 1949. It was translated by June Barrows Mussey and performed in Los Angeles in 1953 under the title The Devil in Boston.

Casts

Original 1953 Broadway cast:

In June 1953 Miller recast the production, simplified the "pitiless sets of rude buildings" and added a scene.
Boo Alexander – Betty Parris
Jacqueline Andre – Tituba
Fred Stewart – Rev. Samuel Parris
Madeleine Sherwood – Abigail Williams
Barbara Stanton – Susanna Walcott
Jane Hoffman – Mrs Ann Putnam
Raymond Bramley – Thomas Putnam
Dorothy Joliffe – Mercy Lewis
Jennie Egan – Mary Warren
Arthur Kennedy – John Proctor
Jean Adair – Rebecca Nurse
Joseph Sweeney – Giles Corey
E. G. Marshall – Rev. John Hale
Beatrice Straight – Elizabeth Proctor
Graham Velsey – Francis Nurse
Don McHenry – Ezekiel Cheever
George Mitchell – Marshall Herrick
Philip Coolidge – Judge Hathorne
Walter Hampden – Deputy Governor Danforth
Adele Fortin – Sarah Good
Donald Marye – Hopkins
The production was directed by Jed Harris and produced by Kermit Bloomgarden.

2002 Broadway revival cast:
Liam Neeson – John Proctor
Laura Linney – Elizabeth Proctor
Brian Murray – Deputy Governor Danforth
John Benjamin Hickey – Rev. John Hale
Christopher Evan Welch – Rev. Parris
Angela Bettis – Abigail Williams
Tom Aldredge – Giles Corey
Stephen Lee Anderson – Hopkins
Kristen Bell – Susanna Wallcott
Jennifer Carpenter – Mary Warren
Betsy Hogg – Betty Parris
J.R. Horne – Judge Hathorne
Patrice Johnson – Tituba
Sevrin Anne Mason – Mercy Lewis
Paul O'Brien – Thomas Putnam
Jeanna Paulsen – Ann Putnam
Frank Raiter – Francis Nurse
Dale Soules – Sarah Good/voice of Martha Corey
Helen Stenborg – Rebecca Nurse
Henry Stram – Ezekiel Cheever
Jack Willis – Marshal Herrick

2016 Broadway revival cast:
Ben Whishaw – John Proctor
Sophie Okonedo – Elizabeth Proctor
Ciarán Hinds – Deputy Governor Danforth
Saoirse Ronan – Abigail Williams
Bill Camp – Rev. John Hale
Tavi Gevinson – Mary Warren
Jason Butler Harner – Rev. Samuel Parris
Jim Norton – Giles Corey
Tina Benko – Ann Putnam / Sarah Good
Jenny Jules – Tituba
Thomas Jay Ryan – Thomas Putnam
Brenda Wehle – Rebecca Nurse
Teagle F. Bougere – Judge Hathorne
Michael Braun – Ezekiel Cheever
Elizabeth Teeter – Betty Parris
Ashlei Sharpe Chestnut – Susanna Walcott
Ray Anthony Thomas – Francis Nurse
Erin Wilhelmi – Mercy Lewis
This production was directed by Ivo van Hoveand featured an original score composed by Philip Glass.

Historical accuracy
In 1953, the year the play debuted, Miller wrote, "The Crucible is taken from history. No character is in the play who did not take a similar role in Salem, 1692." This does not appear to be accurate as Miller made both deliberate changes and incidental mistakes. Abigail Williams' age was increased from 11 or 12 to 17, probably to add credence to the backstory of Proctor's affair with Abigail. John Proctor himself was 60 years old in 1692, but portrayed as much younger in the play, for the same reason.

Miller claimed, in A Note on the Historical Accuracy of this Play, that "while there were several judges of almost equal authority, I have symbolized them all in Hathorne and Danforth". However, this conflates Danforth with the historical and extremely influential figure of William Stoughton, who is not a character and is only briefly mentioned in the play. Both men were subsequent Deputy Governors, but it was Stoughton (who, alone among the judges, was a bachelor who never married) who ordered further deliberations after the jury initially acquitted Rebecca Nurse. He refused to ever acknowledge that the trials had been anything other than a success, and was infuriated when Governor Phips (whose own wife, somehow, had been named as a possible witch) ended the trials for good and released the prisoners.

Danforth did not sit on the Court of Oyer and Terminer. In fact he is recorded as being critical of the conduct of the trials, and played a role in bringing them to an end. In the play, Thomas and especially Ann Putnam are disconsolate over the fact that only one of their children has survived to adolescence. In real life, the Putnams (who both died in 1699) were survived by ten of their twelve children, including Ann Jr. Thomas Putnam's conduct during the witch trial hysteria has been amply documented to have been almost entirely due to financial motivations and score-settling, something the play only makes reference to after introducing the Putnams' fictional deceased offspring as part of the plot narrative.

In the 1953 essay, "Journey to The Crucible", Miller writes of visiting Salem and feeling like the only one interested in what really happened in 1692. Many of Miller's characters were based on people who had little in the public record other than their statements from the trials, but others survived to expand, recant, or comment on the role they played at Salem, including jurors, accusers, survivors, and judges. Rev. Parris issued his first in a series of apologies on November 26, 1694, and was removed from his position in 1697. In 1698, Hale finished composing a lengthy essay about Salem that was reprinted by George Burr in 1914.

Language of the period
The play's action takes place 70 years after the community arrived as settlers from Britain. The people on whom the characters are based would have retained strong regional dialects from their home country. Miller gave all his characters the same colloquialisms, such as "Goody" or "Goodwife", and drew on the rhythms and speech patterns of the King James Bible to achieve the effect of historical perspective he wanted.

Title
Miller originally called the play Those Familiar Spirits before renaming it as The Crucible. The word "crucible" is defined as a severe test or trial; alternately, a container in which metals or other substances are subjected to high temperatures. The characters whose moral standards prevail in the face of death, such as John Proctor and Rebecca Nurse, symbolically refuse to sacrifice their principles or to falsely confess.

Adaptations

Film
 1957 – The Crucible (also titled Hexenjagd or Les Sorcières de Salem), a joint Franco-East German film production by Belgian director Raymond Rouleau with a screenplay adapted by Jean-Paul Sartre.
 1996 – The Crucible with a screenplay by Arthur Miller himself. The cast included Paul Scofield, Daniel Day-Lewis, and Winona Ryder. This adaptation earned Miller an Academy Award nomination for Best Screenplay Based on Material Previously Produced or Published, his only nomination.
 2014 – The Old Vic's production of The Crucible which starred Richard Armitage and directed by Yaël Farber was filmed and distributed to cinemas across the UK, Ireland, and the United States.

Stage
The play was adapted by composer Robert Ward as an opera, The Crucible, which was first performed in 1961 and received the 1962 Pulitzer Prize for Music and the New York Music Critics' Circle Award.

William Tuckett presented a ballet at The Royal Ballet in London in 2000 to a collage of music by Charles Ives with designs by Ralph Steadman. A production by Helen Pickett for the Scottish Ballet was first performed in 2019 at the Edinburgh International Festival; its American premiere was in May 2020 at The Kennedy Center's  Eisenhower Theater in Washington, D.C.

Television
The play has been presented several times on television. A 1968 production starred George C. Scott as John Proctor, Colleen Dewhurst (Scott's wife at the time) as Elizabeth Proctor, Melvyn Douglas as Thomas Danforth, and Tuesday Weld as Abigail Williams. A production by the Royal Shakespeare Company at the Gielgud Theatre in London's West End in 2006 was recorded for the Victoria and Albert Museum's National Video Archive of Performance.

Editions
Miller, Arthur The Crucible (Harmondsworth: Viking Press, 1971);  (edited; with an introduction by Gerald Weales. Contains the full text based on the Collected Plays, and various critical essays)
Miller, Arthur The Crucible Drama in Two Acts (Dramatists Play Service, Inc., © 1954, by Arthur Miller (Acting Edition)

See also
The Devils

References
Notes

Sources

Further reading

External links

 
 
 
 
The Crucible study guide, SparkNotes

1953 plays
Plays by Arthur Miller
Adultery in plays
Broadway plays
Off-Broadway plays
Plays about McCarthyism
Plays based on actual events
Salem witch trials in fiction
Tony Award-winning plays
American plays adapted into films
Plays adapted into operas
Plays adapted into television shows
Plays set in Massachusetts
Plays set in the 17th century
Tragedy plays
Allegory